Enrique "Kike" García Martínez (born 25 November 1989), sometimes known as just Kike, is a Spanish professional footballer who plays as a forward for CA Osasuna.

He began his career at Real Murcia, competing in five Segunda División seasons before a €3.5 million transfer to Middlesbrough in 2014. After one and a half seasons in the Football League Championship, he returned to Spain with Eibar.

García played for Spain at under-20 level.

Club career

Murcia
Born in Motilla del Palancar, Cuenca, García joined Real Murcia's youth categories aged 18, after a brief spell with local CD Quintanar del Rey. He made his senior debut with the former's reserves in the 2007–08 season, in Tercera División.

On 23 May 2009, García played his first match as a professional, coming on as a substitute for Quique de Lucas in a 2–2 away draw against RC Celta de Vigo in the Segunda División. He scored his first goal roughly a month later, the first in a 2–1 home victory over UD Salamanca. In November he signed a new three-year contract, being definitely promoted to the main squad.

García suffered an injury to his fibula in September 2011 and, despite being initially sidelined for a month, he was out of action for the entire campaign. In October of the following year he signed a new deal with Murcia, running until 2016.

In his final year with the Pimentoneros, 2013–14, García was the joint second top scorer in the league with 23 goals and helped his team to the La Liga promotion play-offs. He was also May's Player of the Month.

Middlesbrough
On 11 July 2014, García joined English Football League Championship side Middlesbrough, in a €3.5 million (£2.7 million) deal. He was signed by compatriot Aitor Karanka, who had worked with him at international youth level, and made his competitive debut on 9 August by starting at home to Birmingham City on the opening day of the season, scoring his team's second goal in the 66th minute for a 2–0 home win. He found the net again in his second appearance three days later, replacing Adam Reach early into the second half of a Football League Cup tie at Oldham Athletic and scoring the last goal in a 3–0 victory.

García came on for Jelle Vossen in the 86th minute of Middlesbrough's FA Cup fourth round match at reigning Premier League champions Manchester City on 24 January 2015, and scored the second goal of a 2–0 win. On 10 February, he netted an 88th-minute winner in a 2–1 away defeat of Blackpool, a result which moved his team above AFC Bournemouth into first place.

García scored in Middlesbrough's 3–0 win over Brentford on 15 May 2015, which advanced the hosts to the play-off final 5–1 on aggregate. He was a substitute in the decisive match, a 0–2 loss to Norwich City at Wembley Stadium.

On 15 August 2015, García scored his first two-goal haul for Middlesbrough, a first-half double in a 3–0 home win against Bolton Wanderers. He scored and assisted Christian Stuani on 19 December in a 3–0 victory at Brighton & Hove Albion, which ended the hosts' unbeaten season and put the opposition on top of the league table.

Eibar
The signings of strikers David Nugent and Jordan Rhodes at Middlesbrough led to speculation about García's future at the club, creating extra pressure for him to be included in the starting line-up. After interest from fellow league teams Leeds United and Wolverhampton Wanderers, he left and on 2 February 2016 signed for SD Eibar in the top flight, but a late registration meant that he would be ineligible to play until the following season.

García finally made his debut for the Basques on 19 August 2016, starting in a 2–1 away loss against Deportivo de La Coruña. He scored seven goals in his debut campaign – nine in all competitions – helping to a tenth-place finish.

On 1 May 2021, García scored all of his side's goals in the 3–0 home victory over Deportivo Alavés. He totalled 12 for the season, in an eventual relegation as last.

Osasuna
García continued in the Spanish top tier in the 2021 off-season, with the free agent joining CA Osasuna on a three-year contract with a €15 million buyout clause. He scored his first goal for his new team on 29 August, from the penalty spot in a 3–2 win at Cádiz CF.

International career
García was called up to the Spain under-20 team in June 2009, for that year's Mediterranean Games. He was also in Luis Milla's list for the 2009 FIFA U-20 World Cup.

Career statistics

Club

Honours
Murcia
Segunda División B: 2010–11

Spain U20
Mediterranean Games: 2009

Individual
Segunda División Player of the Month: May 2014

Notes

References

External links

1989 births
Living people
Sportspeople from the Province of Cuenca
Spanish footballers
Footballers from Castilla–La Mancha
Association football forwards
La Liga players
Segunda División players
Segunda División B players
Real Murcia Imperial players
Real Murcia players
SD Eibar footballers
CA Osasuna players
English Football League players
Middlesbrough F.C. players
Spain youth international footballers
Competitors at the 2009 Mediterranean Games
Mediterranean Games medalists in football
Mediterranean Games gold medalists for Spain
Spanish expatriate footballers
Expatriate footballers in England
Spanish expatriate sportspeople in England